Watut Rural LLG is a local-level government (LLG) of Morobe Province, Papua New Guinea. The Watut language is spoken in the LLG.

Wards
01. Menhi
02. Hawata
03. Pararoa
04. Andarora
05. Society (including Manki village)
06. Sapanda
07. Gawapu
08. Nauti Aid Post
09. Ekopa
10. Baini
11. Kebi
12. Malangta

See also
Watut River

References

Local-level governments of Morobe Province